Angelo Maria Amorevoli (16 September 1716 – 15 November 1798) was a leading Italian tenor in Baroque opera.

Biography

Angelo Amorevoli began singing in opera seria when he was just thirteen: in 1729 he sang in revivals of the musical dramas, Amore e gratitudine, probably by Flavio Carlo Lanciani, and Ottone in villa by Antonio Vivaldi. The following year he was on the stage in Rome for Porpora’s operas Mitridate and Siface, and in Venice for Hasse’s Dalisa. From 1731 to 1735 he took part in major operatic productions in Turin, Milan, and other towns of northern Italy. From 1736 to 1740 he moved to Naples, where he took part in eleven premières, one of which was Sarro’s Achille in Sciro, the drama that inaugurated the Teatro di San Carlo on 4 November 1737.

In 1739 he traveled to Vienna, where he attracted a lot of attention, primarily with his interpretation of Vivaldi's Feraspe. On 26 December 1740 he took part in the inauguration of the new Teatro Regio in Turin, performing the part of Mitrane in Francesco Feo's Arsace. In 1741 he made his debut both in Florence, and in London, where he sang several productions at the King's Theatre from October 1741 to May 1743. He returned to Italy from 1744 to 1745 where he was on the stage in Milan. He resolved to move to Dresden in order to be given the chance of singing in Hasse's operas. There, the Hamburg composer would give him the satisfaction of performing the title role in his opera Solimano which was premièred in 1753.

In 1748 Amorevoli visited Vienna again, and there he met the celebrated librettist and great poet Pietro Metastasio, who highly commended his singing ability, and took part in a third theatre inauguration, at the Burgtheater, singing in Gluck's La Semiramide Riconosciuta (Ircano). He then lived in Milan again from 1748 to 1749 and from 1759 to 1764, the year he decided to retire from the stage. Returned definitively to Dresden, he was engaged by the Saxon Court, but only as a chamber and Church singer, which posts he held until about 1771. He died in Dresden in 1798.

Artistic features 

Angelo Amorevoli is considered one of the greatest tenors in the first half of the 18th century's  European operatic scene and the leader, together with Annibale Pio Fabri (and Francesco Borosini), of tenor revenge in the world of Baroque music drama. Before them, the tenor, which used to show marked baritonal characteristics, was employed in third leading parts, in buffo roles, often interpreting en travesti figures of old women. With the coming of the new tenor class led by Amorevoli, things changed: the vocal range and tessitura employed remained substantially baritonal, reaching the summit of B4 flat. The main change, however, was the unheard-of coloratura virtuosity the new tenor class proved themselves equal to, which enabled the tenors to achieve a real breakthrough, finally conquering leading roles in Baroque operas. These included great roles of fathers, commanders, antagonists villains (the same kind of roles that would later become peculiar to the modern baritone). In this new field, Amorevoli took the lead wherever in Europe he sang, and with the greatest musicians of his era, including Vivaldi and Hasse. Amorevoli worked with Hasse in Dresden for many years.  Their collaboration culminated with Segeste'''s allegro, Solcar pensa un mar sicuro, from the version of Arminio produced in that town in 1745, which was the most acrobatic coloratura aria of tempest that had ever, up to that time, been granted to a male voice.

Roles created
The following list is not complete.

 Sources 

 G. Zechmeister: Die Wiener Theater nächst der Burg und nächst dem Kärntnertor von 1747 bis 1776 (Vienna, 1971)
 R. Celletti: Storia del belcanto, Discanto Edizioni, Fiesole, 1983, passim E. Selfridge-Field: Pallade veneta: Writings on Music in Venetian Society 1650–1750, p. 310 (Venezia, 1985)
 W.C. Holmes: Opera Observed: Views of a Florentine Impresario in the Early Eighteenth Century (Chicago, 1993)
 S. Mamy: Les grands castrats napolitains à Venise au XVIIIe siècle, pp. 41, 120 (Liège, 1994)
 S. Caruselli (a cura di), Grande enciclopedia della musica lirica, Longanesi &C. Periodici S.p.A., Rome, Vol. 4, p. 1196/1197
 S. Hansell, K. Lipton: New Grove Dictionary of Music and Musicians, ad nomen''
 This article contains substantial material translated from Angelo Amorevoli in the Italian Wikipedia.

Notes

1716 births
1798 deaths
Italian operatic tenors
Musicians from Venice